Amado Povea (born 30 April 1955) is a Cuban footballer. He competed in the men's tournament at the 1980 Summer Olympics.

References

External links
 
 

1955 births
Living people
Cuban footballers
Cuba international footballers
Association football defenders
FC Pinar del Río players
Olympic footballers of Cuba
Footballers at the 1980 Summer Olympics
People from San Cristóbal, Cuba